The following is a list of Royal Holloway, University of London people, including alumni, members of faculty and fellows. It is not exhaustive.

Notable alumni

Royal Holloway College, Bedford College and RHUL have over 80,000 alumni.

Entertainment, media, theatre

 Ali Hashem (born 1980) Lebanese journalist, writer and broadcaster
 Chris Aldridge, British radio newsreader (BBC Radio 4)
 David Benson (born 1962), English comedian, writer and actor
 Peter Bramley, British actor, director and theatre director
 Mark Carwardine, Zoologist, Writer, wildlife photographer, TV and radio presenter
 Candace Chong Mui Ngam (born 1976), Hong Kong playwright
 Richard Clarke (born 1978), English radio presenter
 James Dagwell (born 1974), British journalist
 Isabel Fay (born 1979), English comedy writer and character comedian
 Emma Freud OBE (born 1962), English broadcaster and cultural commentator
 Pippa Guard (born 1952), English actress
 Janice Hadlow, controller of BBC Two
 Lenny Henry (born 1958), Television presenter 
 Alex Hyndman (born 1978) British newsreader
 Robin Ince (born 1969), English comedian
 Anthony Jabre, film producer and financier
 Karena Johnson, English theatre director
 Roxanne McKee (born 1980), British actress and model
 John Moloney, comedian and comedy writer
 Mary Nightingale (born 1964), British newsreader
 Jeremy Northam (born 1961), actor
 Simon Nye (born 1958), English comic television writer
 Lucy Owen (born 1970), Welsh newsreader
 Ben Richardson (b.198?), British cinematographer
 Mark Strong (born 1963) English actor
 Francis Wheen (born 1957) British journalist, writer and broadcaster
 Roger Wright (born 1956) Controller of BBC Radio 3 and director of the BBC Proms

Literature
 Tahmima Anam (born 1975), Bangladeshi-born writer and novelist
 Ivy Compton-Burnett (1884–1969), English novelist
 Richmal Crompton (1890–1969), English writer of Just William
 George Eliot (1819–1880), British novelist
 Jane Gardam OBE FRSL (born 1928), novelist
 Rosemary Manning (1911–1988), British author
 Gerda Mayer, English poet
 Jojo Moyes (born 1969), British novelist
 Redell Olsen (born 1971), poet, performer and academic
 Sophie Robinson, (born 1985) contemporary English poet
 Miranda Seymour (born 1948), Biographer, novelist
 Jacqueline Simpson (born 1930), British author and folklorist
 Carol Townend (born 1953) English author

Music
 Richard Baker (born 1972), British composer and conductor
 Susan Bullock CBE (born 1958), English soprano
 Jonathan Cole (born 1970), British composer
 Tansy Davies (born 1973), British composer
 Example (musician) (born 1982), British singer, rapper and songwriter
 Sarah Fox (born 1973) English operatic soprano
 Geoff Hannan (born 1972), British composer
 Dame Felicity Lott DBE (born 1947), English soprano
 Ivan Moody (born 1964), British composer
 Paul Newland (born 1966), British composer
 Ewan Pearson (born 1972), British music producer
 Andrew Poppy (born 1954), British composer, pianist and music producer
 China Soul (born 1988) American-British singer/songwriter
 Joby Talbot (born 1971) British composer
 KT Tunstall (born 1975) Scottish singer and songwriter
 John Scott Whiteley (born 1950) York Minster organist and composer

Politics

 Abbas Ahmad Akhoundi (born 1957), Iranian politician
 Catherine Ashton (born 1956), British Labour politician; High Representative of the EU for Foreign Affairs and Security Policy; vice president, European Commission
 Norman Baker (born 1957) Liberal Democrat MP for Lewes 1997–2015
 Gregory Barker  MP (born 1966), British politician
 Emily Davison (1872–1913), English suffragette activist
 Dame Janet Fookes DBE DL (born 1936) English politician, Conservative member House of Lords
 Norvela Forster (1931–1993) British businesswoman, exporter and politician (MEP)
 Jean Henderson (1899–1997),  British barrister and Liberal Party politician
 Moussa Ibrahim (born 1974), Gaddafi spokesman during the 2011 Libyan civil war
 Stewart Jackson MP (born 1965), British politician
 Tess Kingham (born 1963), British politician
 Jessica Lee MP (born 1976), British politician
 Victoria Prentis MP (born 1971), Conservative MP
 Jenny Randerson (born 1948), Welsh Liberal Democrat politician
 Andrew Stephenson MP (born 1981), British politician
 Frances Stevenson (1888–1972), personal secretary and second wife of David Lloyd George
 Valerie Vaz MP (born 1954), British politician
 Diana Warwick, Baroness Warwick of Undercliffe (born 1945) Labour member House of Lords

Science
 David Bellamy OBE (1933–2019) Botanist, environmentalist, author and broadcaster
 Martin Buck FRS (born 1956) microbiologist
 John B. Cosgrave (born 1946), Irish mathematician
 Jackie Hunter (born 1956) chief executive BBSRC
 Dame Kathleen Lonsdale DBE FRS (1903–1971), crystallographer
 Rosalind Pitt-Rivers FRS (1907–1990) biochemist
 Helen Porter FRS (1899–1987) botanist, first female professor of Imperial College London
 Eva Germaine Rimington Taylor (1871–1966), English geographer, historian of science
 Derek Yalden (1940–2013) English zoologist, reader at the University of Manchester
 Grace Waterhouse (1906–1996), British mycologist

Sport
 Sophie Christiansen  (born 1987), gold medal winner, Paralympics equestrian events
Jessica Eddie (born 1984), British rower, Olympic silver medalist
 Helene Raynsford (born 1979), British paralympic rower and gold medallist
 Andy Sheridan, (born 1979) Rugby Union, Sale Sharks and England
 Joe Saward (born 1961), British Formula One journalist
 Alex Lewington (born 1991) English rugby player
 Theo Brophy-Clews (born 1997) English rugby player

Other

 Kitty Anderson DBE (1903–79) BA PhD Head North London Collegiate School 1945–65
 Muhammad Abdul Bari MBE (b.1953), Former Secretary General Muslim Council of Britain
 Sophie Bryant (1850–1922) Anglo-Irish mathematician, educator, feminist and activist
 Helen Cam CBE FRHistS (1885–1968), English historian
 Lucy Caslon, founder and director of charity Msizi Africa
 Ilse Crawford (born 1962), British designer
 Edith Durham (1863–1944), British traveller, artist, writer and anthropologist
 Tania El Khoury (born 1976), Lebanese artist
 Dame Janet Finch (born 1946) VC, Prof Social Rel, Keele 1995–2010, hon fellow RHC 1999
 Jayne-Anne Gadhia (born 1961), Chief Executive Officer of Virgin Money UK
 Robert Garside (born 1967), English record-breaking adventurer
 Nick Hallard (born 1975), British artist
 Giles Hart (1949–2005), British engineer and trade union activist
 Duncan McCargo, British academic
 Louisa Martindale CBE FRCOG (1872–1966), British physician and surgeon
 Victor Olisa QPM, former senior Metropolitan Police officer
 Jennifer Page CBE (b. 1944), former chief executive of the London Millennium Dome project
 Thea Porter (1927–2000), fashion designer (expelled)
 Sarah Parker Remond (1815-c.1894) African-American lecturer, abolitionist and doctor
 Simon Thurley CBE (born 1963), British architectural historian
 Amanda Vickery professor of early modern history at Queen Mary, University of London
 Ronald Alan Waldron (born 1927), English medievalist
 Ahmed Yerima, Nigerian professor, administrator

 Sofia Abramovich (born 1995), daughter of Roman Abramovich

Notable staff

The following is a list of notable office-holders, academics and other teachers or researchers:

 H. B. Acton, taught political philosophy
 Philip Allen, Baron Allen of Abbeydale, Member college council at the merger with Bedford
 Khizar Humayun Ansari OBE, director of the Centre for Ethnic Minority Studies
 Sarah Ansari, professor of history
 Geoffrey Alderman RSA, professor of politics and contemporary history
 Giovanni Aquilecchia, professor of Italian and Italian Renaissance scholar
 Akil N. Awan, lecturer in Modern History
 Gillian Bailey, fellow in theatre studies
 George Barger, professor of chemistry
 Dame Gillian Beer, former President of Clare Hall, Cambridge
 Sir William Benham, Fellow of the Royal Society, zoologist
 Margaret Jane Benson, Professor of Botany
 John Bercow, Professor of Politics, former Speaker of the House of Commons
Francis Berry, professor of English literature
 Luiza Bialasiewicz, senior lecturer in human geography
 James Booth, Fellow of the Royal Society, mathematician
 Mark Bowden, professor of composition
 Andrew Bowie, professor of philosophy and German
 Mary Boyce, taught Anglo-Saxon literature and archaeology
 David Bradby, professor of drama and theatre studies
 Daniel Joseph Bradley, Fellow of the Royal Society
 Peter Bramley professor of biochemistry
 Kai Brodersen, visiting professor in ancient history and classics
 Jonathan Burrows, visiting professor of drama and theatre
 Hugh Longbourne Callendar, Fellow of the Royal Society
 Chris Carey, professor of classics
 William Benjamin Carpenter CB, Fellow of the Royal Society
 Lorna Casselton FRS, fungal geneticist
 Philip Cashian, composer, taught in the music department
 David Cesarani, OBE, Research Professor in History
 William Gilbert Chaloner, Fellow of the Royal Society
 Justin Champion, professor of the history of early modern ideas
 Alexey Chervonenkis, professor of computer science
 Christopher Cocksworth, college chaplain, now Bishop of Coventry
 Paul Cohn, Fellow of the Royal Society
 Grenville Cole, Fellow of the Royal Society
 Peter Conrad, visiting professor in sociology
 Nicholas Cook, professorial research fellow in music
 Glen Cowan, professor of physics
 Denis Cosgrove, professor of geography and dean of the graduate school
 Joseph Mordaunt Crook CBE FBA, historian
 Tim Cresswell, professor of human geography
 J. Mordaunt Crook, professor of architectural history
 Hilda Ellis Davidson, lecturer in archaeology and anthropology
 Veronica Della Dora FBA, professor of human geography
 Antonella De Santo, lecturer in experimental physics, coordinator for the ATLAS experiment-UK supersymmetry group
 Whitfield Diffie, visiting professor at the information security group
 Richard Dixon, Fellow of the Royal Society, biologist
 Roland Dobbs, emeritus professor of physics
 Klaus Dodds FRGS, professor of geopolitics
 Felix Driver FBA FAcSS FRGS, professor of human geography
 Michael Eysenck, (now emeritus) professor of psychology
 Lilian Faithfull CBE, university administrator
 Giles Foden, fellow in creative and performing arts
 Sir Gregory Foster, former vice-chancellor of the University of London
 Mary Fowler, professor of geology, now Master of Darwin College, Cambridge
 Harold Munro Fox, Fellow of the Royal Society
 Dame Jane Francis, director of the British Antarctic Survey
 Dame Helen Gardner, assistant lecturer in English literature
 Reginald Gates, Fellow of the Royal Society
 A. C. Grayling CBE, Master of New College of the Humanities
 Edith Hall, professor of classics and drama
 Robert Gavin Hampson, professor of modern literature
 Glyn Harman, professor of mathematics
 Nick Hardwick CBE, former HM Chief Inspector of Prisons
 J. P. E. Harper-Scott, professor of music history and theory
 Leonard Hawkes, Fellow of the Royal Society
 Harriet Hawkins FRGS, professor of geography
 Margaret Hayes-Robinson, Head of History
 John F Healy, professor of classics and archaeology
 Sir Frank Heath GBE, KCB, educationist and civil servant 
 Olaus Henrici, Fellow of the Royal Society
 Frank Horton, professor of physics and vice-chancellor of London University 1939–45
 Dame Olwen Hufton, professorial research fellow in the history department
 Jonathan Holmes, senior lecturer in drama
 Joan M. Hussey, professor of history
 Julian Johnson FBA, Regius Professor of Music
 Brian Juden, professor of French 1970–1985
 Sharman Kadish, scholar of Jewish British history
 Peter Knight, Jubilee research fellow in quantum optics
 Robert Latham FBA, historian, dean of men, joint author 1970–83 The Diary of Samuel Pepys
 Robert Lethbridge chair French, head of dept, dean of the graduate school, vice-principal
 Roger Lockyer, reader in history, specialist in Tudor and Stuart Britain
 Sir Oliver Lodge, Fellow of the Royal Society
 S L Loney, professor of mathematics
 Peter Longerich, director of the research centre for the Holocaust and 20th century history
 John Duncan Mackie CBE, historian
 Louis MacNeice CBE, poet and playwright
 Ursula Martin CBE, computer scientist
 J. D. Mackie, professor of modern history
 Ursula Martin, taught in the computer science department
 Sir William McCrea FRS, professor of mathematics 1944–66
 Oliver McGregor, Baron McGregor of Durris, sociologist
 Katie Mitchell OBE, professor of Theatre Directing. Former associate director of the National Theatre, Royal Court Theatre and Royal Shakespeare Company. Internationally renowned and award-winning theatre director.
 Sir Andrew Motion FRSL, Poet Laureate, professor of creative writing
 Sean Murphy, professor of cryptology
 David Naccache, visiting professor at the information security group
 Anthony J. Naldrett, visiting professor of geology
 Meredith Oakes, taught play-writing
 Ben O'Loughlin, prof. of international relations, co-director, New Political Communication Unit
 Sir Roger Penrose OM, Fellow of the Royal Society
 Dame Lillian Penson, professor of modern history; first woman vice-chancellor of London University
 Kevin Porée record producer, songwriter, composer, arranger, lecturer theatre studies
 H. F. M. Prescott, Jubilee research fellow on Thomas Wolsey
 Boris Rankov, professor of Roman history
 Dan Rebellato, professor of contemporary theatre
 Jonathan Riley-Smith FRHistS, taught in the history department
 Adam Roberts, teacher of literature and creative writing
 Eric Robertson, professor of modern French literary and visual culture
 Francis Robinson CBE, professor of the history of South Asia
 Matt Robshaw, lecturer in cryptology
 Francis Rose MBE botanist
 Conrad Russell, 5th Earl Russell (1937–2004), reader in history
 William James Russell, Fellow of the Royal Society
 Nigel Saul, professor of medieval history
 Andrew Cunningham Scott emeritus prof. of geology, dir science communications 1996–2007
 Andrew Sentance, visiting professor, economist
 Jo Shapcott, poet and lecturer in creative writing
 Pankaj Sharma, Professor of Clinical Neurology
 Dame Barbara Shenfield, social scientist and politician
 David Skinner, taught in the music department
 Ray Solomonoff, visiting professor at the Computer Research Learning Centre
 Oskar Spate, lecturer in geography
 Sonya Stephens, President of Mount Holyoke College
 Anthony Stockwell FRAS, professor of modern history
 Alex Stokes, lecturer in physics
 Francis Thompson CBE, historian
 Adam Tickell, Vice-Chancellor of the University of Sussex
 Kathleen Tillotson CBE, academic and literary critic
 Samuel Tolansky FRS FRAS, professor of physics
 Vladimir Vapnik, professor of computer science and statistics
 Andrew Wathey CBE, Vice-Chancellor of the University of Northumbria
 Michael Walker OBE, mathematician
 Martin West OM FBA, classical scholar 
 Nathan Widder, professor of political theory
 William Wilson, Fellow of the Royal Society
 Sir Bernard Williams, philosopher
 Michael John Williams, reader in international relations
 John Woolrich, composer, taught in the music department
 Barbara Wootton, Baroness Wootton of Abinger CH, sociologist

See also
 List of Principals of Royal Holloway, University of London

References

Lists of people by university or college in London
Royal Holloway, University of London